Liezel Huber and Lisa Raymond were the defending champions but chose not to participate together. Huber played with Hsieh Su-wei, but lost in the first round to Bethanie Mattek-Sands and Sania Mirza.  Raymond played alongside Samantha Stosur but lost in the quarterfinals to Cara Black and Anastasia Rodionova.
Mattek-Sands and Mirza won the title, defeating Nadia Petrova and Katarina Srebotnik in the final, 6–4, 2–6, [10–7].

Seeds

Draw

Draw

References
Main Draw

Dubai Tennis Championships - Doubles
2013 Women's Doubles